Nicolas Bataille (14 March 1926 – 28 October 2008) was a French actor and director.

Biography
The son of a Parisian architect, Nicolas Bataille (born Roger Bataille) debuted as an actor during the Occupation of France while following the dramatic teachings of René Simon, Tania Balachova, and the comedian Solange Sicard.

He was the first director of the absurdist play "The Bald Soprano" in 1950 on May 11 at the Théâtre des Noctambules in the 5th arrondissement of Paris.

References 

1926 births
2008 deaths
French theatre directors
Male actors from Paris
French male film actors
French male stage actors
20th-century French male actors